Pehin Sri Tan Sri Haji Adenan bin Haji Satem (27 January 1944 – 11 January 2017), popularly known as Tok Nan, was a Malaysian politician who served as the fifth chief minister of Sarawak from March 2014 to his death in January 2017. During his tenure, Adenan held the position as the President of Parti Pesaka Bumiputera Bersatu (PBB), which is part of the Barisan Nasional coalition. He was of Malay descent.

Early life
Adenan was born in Kuching, Sarawak during its occupation by Japan in World War II. He received his early education at St. Joseph's Primary School, and later at St. Joseph's Secondary School. He once worked as a journalist and teacher before pursuing his studies in law at the University of Adelaide, Australia. Upon graduating in 1970, he was appointed as Magistrate from 1971 to 1972. He was appointed assistant secretary for the Ministry of Primary Industries from 1972 to 1974.

Political career
Adenan's political career began in 1976 when he was appointed as the legal advisor and a committee member of Parti Pesaka Bumiputera Bersatu (PBB) Later in 1979, he contested in elections and won twice, the first in a by-election for the Muara Tuang constituency in January, and the third Sarawak state election several months later in the same constituency. Adenan was the member of the Sarawak State Legislative Assembly (MLA) for Muara Tuang from 1979 onwards until he moved to the Tanjong Datu constituency for the 2006 state election, where he won. Apart from that, he also became the Member of Parliament for Batang Sadong after winning the 2004 general election. Prime Minister Abdullah Ahmad Badawi appointed him as the Minister of Natural Resources and Environment. He, however, gave up the post in 2006 and returned to Sarawak. In 2010, he was appointed as the special advisor to Chief Minister Abdul Taib Mahmud, and later in 2011 as State Minister with Special Functions.

Adenan played a role in the 1987 Ming Court Affair, a crisis that involved a power tussle between Abdul Taib Mahmud and the then governor Abdul Rahman Ya'kub. Abdul Rahman was the previous chief minister and Taib's uncle. The crisis helped trigger the 1987 state election after four ministers and three deputy ministers aligned to Abdul Rahman resigned from Taib's cabinet. Adenan sided with Taib, who emerged as the victor in the crisis. Two years earlier, Adenan was appointed by Taib as PBB publicity chief as the former sought to purge Abdul Rahman's influence in the party. In 1987 soon after the seven resignations, Adenan was appointed as the state minister for land development in the Taib cabinet.

Chief Minister
In March 2014, Adenan Satem succeeded Abdul Taib Mahmud as Chief Minister of Sarawak. He officially took the oath of office in a ceremony held at Astana on 28 February 2014, Later that year, in conjunction with the Governor of Sarawak's 78th Birthday, he was awarded the "Datuk Patinggi" title. Prior to the 2016 Sarawak state election, he was praised for inspiring support among Chinese voters. He won his seat of Tanjung Datu with 93.4% of the popular vote. His party won 72 of the 82 available seats.

Relationship with Peninsular Malaysia
As a chief minister, he clashed with federal government from time to time despite his party being part of the ruling federal coalition. He spoke openly about strengthening Sarawak's autonomy and called for higher state's share of petroleum royalty, much to the consternation of Putrajaya and the national oil company Petronas. Among other issues he disagreed with the federal government included official recognition for Unified Examination Certificate (UEC). During his capacity as chief minister, he also announced that Sarawak has adopted English as the official language of the state's administration, apart from Bahasa Malaysia. Malay language activists have criticised Adenan for making English as one of the official languages of Sarawak.

Adenan also advocated the policy of 90% of all teachers from Sarawak should be Sarawakians because only people from Sarawak are sensitive to local needs. He further suggest that educational matters should be handled by the state government so that the rural schools are better looked after. His stance has received criticism for promoting regionalism in a country. Sarawak also started to recognise UEC, in contrast to federal government that does not recognise the UEC certificate. Najib Razak, the then head of the federal government responded positively to demands made by Sarawak. He also appointed a committee, co-chaired by Nancy Shukri (Sarawak) an Anifah Aman (Sabah) to study the devolution of powers to Sabah and Sarawak under federal constitution. At the same time, the federal government leaders was preoccupied with various issues such as resignation of deputy prime minister Muhyiddin Yassin for protesting against 1Malaysia Development Berhad scandal, Sabah State Water Department corruption probe, and economic slowdown due to low prices of raw materials.

Meanwhile, the opposition leaders from the Peninsular Malaysia has held negative opinions regarding Adenan's pronouncements. Former prime minister Mahathir Mohamad stated that such acts would weaken the authority of the federal government. Other leaders such as Mohamad Sabu and Azmin Ali stated that Najib had failed to check Adenan from demanding more from the federal government. Adenan's action of barring opposition leaders from Peninsular Malaysia from campaigning in the state of Sarawak during 2016 Sarawak state election further exacerbates the negative sentiments from the opposition camps.

Besides, Adenan also reinstated that Sarawak would not secede from Malaysia as "it was the wisest decision made by Sarawak 53 years ago".

Death
On 11 January 2017, Adenan died of heart attack at the Sarawak Heart Centre, Kota Samarahan, aged 72 years old. The untimely demise is the first occurrence to a serving Sarawak Chief Minister. He was laid to rest at Samariang Muslim Cemetery in Kuching.

His death was mourned by Sarawakians throughout the week, and many leaders attended his funeral in Kuching.

Credentials
His other credentials were:
 Chairman of Sarawak Foundation (1998-2017)
 Chairman of Swinburne University of Technology Sarawak Campus Council (2004-2017)
 Chairman of the Sarawak Malay Culture Foundation (Amanah Khairat Yayasan Budaya Melayu Sarawak)
 Board of directors for Sarawak Higher Education Foundation (SHEF)
 Board member of the Curtin University, Malaysia
 Chairman, Natural Resources and Environment Board Sarawak (NREB)
 Pro-Chancellor of the Swinburne University of Technology Sarawak Campus (2014-2017)

Honours

Honours of Malaysia
  :
  Commander of the Order of Loyalty to the Crown of Malaysia (PSM) – Tan Sri (2010)

  :
  Grand Commander of the Exalted Order of Malacca (DGSM) – Datuk Seri (2016)
  :
  Meritorious Service Medal (Silver) (PPB)
  Knight Commander of the Most Exalted Order of the Star of Sarawak (PNBS) – Dato Sri (1990)
  Knight Commander of the Order of the Star of Hornbill Sarawak (DA) – Datuk Amar (2009)
  Knight Grand Commander of the Order of the Star of Hornbill Sarawak (DP) – Datuk Patinggi (2014)
  Knight Grand Commander of the Order of the Star of Sarawak (SBS) – Pehin Sri (Posthumous)  (2017)

References

External links 

1944 births
2017 deaths
Melanau people
People from Sarawak
People from Kuching
Malaysian people of Malay descent
Malaysian Muslims
Parti Pesaka Bumiputera Bersatu politicians
Chief Ministers of Sarawak
Government ministers of Malaysia
Sarawak state ministers
Members of the Dewan Rakyat
Members of the Sarawak State Legislative Assembly
Knights Commander of the Most Exalted Order of the Star of Sarawak
Commanders of the Order of Loyalty to the Crown of Malaysia
Knights Grand Commander of the Most Exalted Order of the Star of Sarawak
Knights Commander of the Order of the Star of Hornbill Sarawak
Knights Grand Commander of the Order of the Star of Hornbill Sarawak
University of Adelaide alumni